This is a comprehensive listing of the radio programs made by Orson Welles. Welles was often uncredited for his work, particularly in the years 1934–1937, and he apparently kept no record of his broadcasts.

1934

1935

1936

1937

1938

1939

1940

1941

1942

1943

1944

1945

1946

1947

1948

1950

1951–1952

1952

1953

1954

1956

Notes

References

External links
 Orson Welles on the Air, 1938–1946 at Indiana University Bloomington
 More information

Lists of radio programs
radio
Works by Orson Welles